Iron(II) fluoride or ferrous fluoride is an inorganic compound with the molecular formula FeF2.  It forms a tetrahydrate FeF2·4H2O that is often referred to by the same names.  The anhydrous and hydrated forms are white crystalline solids.

Structure and bonding
Anhydrous FeF2 adopts the TiO2 rutile structure. As such, the iron cations are octahedral and fluoride anions are trigonal planar.

The tetrahydrate can exist in two structures, or polymorphs. One form is rhombohedral and the other is hexagonal, the former having a disorder.

Like most fluoride compounds, the anhydrous and hydrated forms of iron(II) fluoride feature high spin metal center. Low temperature neutron diffraction studies show that the FeF2 is antiferromagnetic. Heat capacity measurements reveal an event at 78.3 K corresponding to ordering of antiferromagnetic state.

Selected physical properties 
FeF2 sublimes between 958 and 1178 K. Using Torsion and Knudsen methods, the heat of sublimation was experimentally determined and averaged to be 271 ± 2 kJ mole−1.

The following reaction is proposed in order to calculate the atomization energy for Fe+:
FeF2 + e  →   Fe+ +  F2 (or 2F)  +  2e

Synthesis and reactions
The anhydrous salt can be prepared by reaction of ferrous chloride with anhydrous hydrogen fluoride.  It is slightly soluble in water (with solubility product Ksp = 2.36×10−6 at 25 °C) as well as dilute hydrofluoric acid, giving a pale green solution. It is insoluble in organic solvents.

The tetrahydrate can be prepared by dissolving iron in warm hydrated hydrofluoric acid and precipitating the result by addition of ethanol.  It oxidizes in moist air to give, inter alia, a hydrate of iron(III) fluoride, (FeF3)2·9H2O.

Uses
FeF2 is used to catalyze some organic reactions.

References

External links
National Pollutant Inventory - Fluoride and compounds fact sheet

Fluorides
Metal halides
Iron(II) compounds